vdk bank, formerly VDK Spaarbank, is a Belgian commercial bank. Vdk bank is a Belgian ethical bank, of which the direct predecessor was founded in the bosom of the active workers' movement. The bank has been the principal commercial sponsor of the football team KAA Gent and the female volleyballteam VDK bank Gent.

History

In 1926, the public savings system was founded in Ghent. A network was built by managing members, such as teachers and employees, who ran the agency as a side-project. Gradually, it has become a fully-fledged branch network and evolved to a savings bank.

After the crisis of the 1930s, a law was passed that separated saving or deposit banks from business or investment banks, and in 1934, the People's Savings System was renamed Volksdepositokas (VDK). VDK continued to operate separately from the Belgian Workers' Cooperative (BAC), with which the Christian savings banks from Antwerp and Brussels, among others, merged. In consultation with BAC, VDK was able to expand significantly after the Second World War in the districts of Ghent and Eeklo in the province of East Flanders.

In 1980, the VDK Spaarbank bought the former Ford garage on Sint-Michielsplein in Ghent from the Vandersmissen family and moved its headquarters there in 1984. Until 1924, the Hotel De Potter dating from 1775 was on this site, which became later the office of the financial institution l'Union de Crédit de Gand.

On 27 August 1992, the VDK savings bank, the vzw ACT (nowadays vzw TRIAS) and the NGO Disop launched the cooperative investment company with social purpose Incofin cvso. Incofin started with an initial capital of 5 million Belgian francs (123,946 euros) and formulated the aim of participating in the risk that local partners and small entrepreneurs in the developing world take. Incofin cvso wants to offer the opportunity to more SMEs to get started, and at the same time give them a better chance of success. In 2017, Incofin celebrated its 25th anniversary and its capital exceeded 40 million euros for the first time. Incofin cvso had more than 2200 shareholders in 2020 and had 44 local financial partners who also provided tailor-made technical support to clients who mainly use microcredit.

In 1993, BAC changed its name to BACOB, grew further into the commercial Artesia Banking Corporation, and after the year 2000, it was merged into the Franco-Belgian bank Dexia. As a result, VDK lost its exclusivity in the Gent-Eeklo region, but was able to expand further in East and West Flanders.

An attempt in 1999 to merge the VDK savings bank into Artesia (predecessor of Belfius) caused much fury in the Christian labor movement and was therefore blocked.

Because of its tradition, vdk bank has always paid a lot of attention to labor rights and human rights in its investments and loans. In recent decades, the environment and climate have also started to play an important role in this, and the bank has positioned itself as a sustainable and ethical bank.

On June 28, 2017, the bank was renamed vdk bank and on November 13, 2019, together with the smaller banks Crelan, AXA Bank, Argenta Group and Bpost, it started setting up Jofico, a joint venture for the purchase, management and maintenance of joint ATMs.

In 2019, vdk bank had a balance sheet total of 4.258 billion euros, with a profit of 16.121 million euros, equity amounted to 328.886 million euros. This result was achieved by 273 employees (248.35 FTE) in 70 offices with just under 140,000 customers.

In August 2020, it was announced that former Groen chairman Wouter Van Besien became the sustainable and ethical banking coordinator at vdk bank.

Management team

Vdk bank has always remained in the hands of the local Christian labor movement. Until 2016, slightly more than half of the shares were held by a few Ghent parties that had linked their fates through a shareholders' agreement: the investment company Volkskracht (17%), vzw De Kade (16%) that leans on Movement.net (the former ACW) and the ACV-Metea trade union (11%). Furthermore, an organization that is related to the Christian health insurance fund and a number of Ghent families are also part of this group.

20.1% of the shares were held by the Arco Group, but from 2008, the implosion of Dexia and the consequences for Arco and its cooperators, a solution was found after a long negotiations by Alain Bostoen, CEO of the Ghent chemical and detergent company Christeyns and also shareholder of bank-insurer KBC, to acquire 4% of the shares of vdk bank.

The remaining shares were bought from Arco by the group of majority shareholders. It is assumed that this happened in proportion to the existing participation in vdk bank, which means that Volkscapacity remains the largest shareholder. The deal valued the bank's equity at the time at 200 million euros. 17.8% of the shares are still held by Belfius. This bank was not involved in the search for a buyer for the Arco shares.

The key managers in the beginning of 2022 are:

Chairman of the executive committee: Leen Van den Neste

Member of the executive committee: Frank Vereecken

Member of the executive committee: Geert Van Caenegem

Member of the executive committee: Michael Voordeckers

Chairman of the Board: Louis Vervloet

General secretary: Pieterjan Vandenhout

External link
www.vdk.be

Sources, notes and/or references
“Het is een goed huwelijk, ook in kwade dagen” www.hln.be, 10 nov. 2017

https://www.tijd.be/ondernemen/banken/arco-vindt-koper-voor-belang-vdk/9759343.html

opvallende carrièreswitch van voormalig Groen-voorzitter Wouter Van Besien: “Ik ben het schouwspel beu” Wouter Van Besien verlaat nationale politiek voor VDK Bank De Zondag, 23 augustus 2020

We wilden niemands speelbal worden, www.trends.be, 23 nov. 2016

https://www.tijd.be/nieuws/archief/kbc-aandeelhouder-bostoen-duikt-op-in-kapitaal-vdk/10199314

References

Banks of Belgium
Ethical banking